Thomas Logan (born 2 July 1985) is a former professional Australian rules footballer who played for the Brisbane Lions and Port Adelaide Football Club in the Australian Football League (AFL).

AFL career

Brisbane Lions career (2005)
He was picked up originally by the Brisbane Lions in the 2003 AFL Draft, at selection number 65 overall. He made his debut for the Brisbane Lions against Port Adelaide in Round 2 of the 2005 AFL season. His two years spent on the Brisbane Lions list were injury ridden. He only played two more games for the club before being delisted at the end of that year.

Port Adelaide career (2006–2015)
At the end of 2005, Logan went back to South Australia, he was then given an offer to train with Port Adelaide over the preseason. He was given a lifeline by Port Adelaide, as they picked him up as a rookie for the 2006 AFL season, on a one-year contract. 

Power player Gavin Wanganeen retired from AFL in 2006, and Tom got his chance, elevated to the senior list because of Gavin's retirement. He made his debut for Port Adelaide in Round 15 against Geelong, and played 8 games straight before the end of the season, kicking the two goals.

He was upgraded to the senior list for the 2007 AFL season, and played the first 4 games of the year. He then didn't play a game until the round 21 match against Geelong, where he helped Port Adelaide stop Geelong's unbeaten run of 14 straight wins. He was kept in the side that beat Fremantle the next week, and West Coast the week after.

In the 2007 Preliminary Final, he kicked 2 goals and had 23 possessions in an almost best on ground performance, helping Port Adelaide to reach the 2007 Grand Final. In the 2007 Grand Final, he managed to kick 1 goal. Logan was delisted by Port at the end of the 2014 season but was later re-drafted as a rookie by the club.

Logan announced his retirement at the end of the 2015 season.

Playing statistics

|-
|- style="background-color: #EAEAEA"
! scope="row" style="text-align:center" | 2005
|
| 4 || 3 || 0 || 1 || 11 || 7 || 18 || 2 || 3 || 0.0 || 0.3 || 3.7 || 2.3 || 6.0 || 0.7 || 1.0
|-
! scope="row" style="text-align:center" | 2006
|
| 44 || 8 || 2 || 4 || 46 || 53 || 99 || 39 || 19 || 0.3 || 0.5 || 5.8 || 6.6 || 12.4 || 4.9 || 2.4
|- style="background-color: #EAEAEA"
! scope="row" style="text-align:center" | 2007
|
| 44 || 9 || 3 || 6 || 56 || 61 || 117 || 39 || 20 || 0.3 || 0.7 || 6.2 || 6.8 || 13.0 || 4.3 || 2.2
|-
! scope="row" style="text-align:center" | 2008
|
| 44 || 19 || 4 || 2 || 178 || 161 || 339 || 114 || 42 || 0.2 || 0.1 || 9.4 || 8.5 || 17.8 || 6.0 || 2.2
|- style="background-color: #EAEAEA"
! scope="row" style="text-align:center" | 2009
|
| 44 || 15 || 7 || 6 || 104 || 104 || 208 || 63 || 28 || 0.5 || 0.4 || 6.9 || 6.9 || 13.9 || 4.2 || 1.9
|-
! scope="row" style="text-align:center" | 2010
|
| 44 || 18 || 4 || 5 || 145 || 178 || 323 || 93 || 48 || 0.2 || 0.3 || 8.1 || 9.9 || 17.9 || 5.2 || 2.7
|- style="background-color: #EAEAEA"
! scope="row" style="text-align:center" | 2011
|
| 44 || 20 || 2 || 3 || 154 || 128 || 282 || 88 || 44 || 0.1 || 0.2 || 7.7 || 6.4 || 14.1 || 4.4 || 2.2
|-
! scope="row" style="text-align:center" | 2012
|
| 44 || 12 || 0 || 1 || 86 || 101 || 187 || 54 || 20 || 0.0 || 0.1 || 7.2 || 8.4 || 15.6 || 4.5 || 1.7
|- style="background-color: #EAEAEA"
! scope="row" style="text-align:center" | 2013
|
| 44 || 10 || 5 || 3 || 76 || 94 || 170 || 45 || 26 || 0.5 || 0.3 || 7.6 || 9.4 || 17.0 || 4.5 || 2.6
|-
! scope="row" style="text-align:center" | 2014
|
| 44 || 3 || 0 || 0 || 30 || 21 || 51 || 18 || 9 || 0.0 || 0.0 || 10.0 || 7.0 || 17.0 || 6.0 || 3.0
|- style="background-color: #EAEAEA"
! scope="row" style="text-align:center" | 2015
|
| 44 || 0 || — || — || — || — || — || — || — || — || — || — || — || — || — || —
|- class="sortbottom"
! colspan=3| Career
! 117
! 27
! 31
! 886
! 908
! 1794
! 555
! 259
! 0.2
! 0.3
! 7.6
! 7.8
! 15.3
! 4.7
! 2.2
|}

References

External links

1985 births
Living people
Port Adelaide Football Club players
Port Adelaide Football Club players (all competitions)
Brisbane Lions players
Glenelg Football Club players
Waratah Football Club players
Australian rules footballers from the Northern Territory
Port Adelaide Football Club (SANFL) players